Shevington High School is a coeducational secondary school located in Shevington in the Metropolitan Borough of Wigan in Greater Manchester, England.

It is a community school administered by Wigan Metropolitan Borough Council, and offers GCSEs. Graduating students often go on to attend St John Rigby College, Runshaw College, Wigan and Leigh College, Southport College or Winstanley College.

It was founded as a County Secondary School in 1959, as part of Lancashire County Council's Education Expansion Programme, on its site near Stockley Wood where it still is based today. During the 1970s, it became a comprehensive school under the control of Wigan Council after the 1974 local government reorganisation.

Notable former pupils
Ben Batt, actor

References

External links
Shevington High School official website

Secondary schools in the Metropolitan Borough of Wigan
Community schools in the Metropolitan Borough of Wigan
Educational institutions established in 1959
1959 establishments in England